McIntyre, Ontario may refer to: 

McIntyre, Lennox and Addington County, Ontario
McIntyre, Grey County, Ontario